The STK 40 AGL, formerly the CIS 40 AGL is a 40 mm automatic grenade launcher, developed in the late 1980s and produced by the Singaporean defence firm Chartered Industries of Singapore (CIS, now ST Kinetics). The launcher is employed primarily by the Singapore Armed Forces and the police and security forces of several other countries.

History
On June 19, 2000, STK announced the release of an upgrade kit, known as the 40mm Automatic Grenade Launcher Air-Bursting System (40mm AGL-ABS). Upgrades consist of the electronic fire control system, the gun computer, the muzzle programming coil as well as the optical sighting system.

On December 13, 2010, the Kuwait Defense Ministry released a statement that the CIS 40 AGL was offered for the Kuwaiti military.

Design
The STK 40 AGL can be mounted on a M3 tripod, a light weigh tripod, a lock/fire mount, softmount, ringmount or on a RWS.

The STK 40 AGL has a Mark II variant, which includes weight reduction of almost 6 kg; a barrel removal system; improved handling, performance, aesthetics and ergonomics. The components, when disassembled, consist of the operating group, barrel, receiver group, top cover group, trigger group.

Users

: STK 40 AGL Mk 2 used by Bangladesh Army.

: Used on Nurol Ejder and Otokar Cobra AFVs
: Made under license by PT Pindad for the Indonesian military as Pindad SPG-3 in 1994.

: Used by the Royal Papua New Guinea Constabulary.

: Philippine Army, Philippine Marine Corps
: Used as a main armament on the Bionix 40/50 IFVs.

Notes

References

Bibliography

External links
Official Site

Automatic grenade launchers
40×53mm grenade launchers
Grenade launchers of Singapore